Piraeus Bank Beograd (full legal name: Piraeus Bank a.d. Beograd), was a Serbian bank that existed from May 2005 until October 2018 when it was acquired by Direktna Banka. It was majority owned by Greek Piraeus Bank. Its particular activities were in the areas of large corporate banking, retail banking and SMEs.

History
Piraeus Bank started its operations in the Serbian market with a network of 9 branches and 176 employees. Today, the Bank has a business network of 34 branches, approximately 550 employees, it has developed sector of Piraeus Leasing and Piraeus Rent, and tens of thousands of clients.

In November 2017, Direktna Banka bought Piraeus Bank Beograd from the Greek Piraeus Bank, for a sum in the range of 58–61 million euros. The complete merge is expected to be completed by the first quarter of 2018, and thus way Direktna Banka would have a total equity worth over 500 million euros.

See also

 List of banks in Serbia

References

External links
 Company overview from NBS

Banks established in 1995
Banks disestablished in 2018
Companies based in Belgrade
2017 mergers and acquisitions